Vadfoss is a village in Kragerø municipality of Norway, located on the Kammerfoss River (alternate name: Kragerø River) midway between Helle to the east and Sannidal to the west. Since the village is so small and close to Helle, Statistics Norway considers them a single village Vadfoss/Helle with a combined population of 1,556.

Location
The river beside Vadfoss has no clear name due to the fact that it changes names several times along its length, but it is often referred to as the Kragerø watershed estuary or sometimes the Kragerø River (see the Gallery section for a graphical representation of its many names).  In general terms, it is the river stemming from the lake Toke and leading out to the Kilsfjord.  The first  of the river that spans from Toke to the lake Farsjø is referred to as the Lundereid River.  After that, it is called Fossene and then Tisjø until it reaches Tveitreid Lake.  The section flowing from Tveitreid Lake is referred to as Vadfoss River up until it hits the Vafoss Dam.  After that it is called Kammerfoss River all the way until it reaches Kilsfjord.

The main road serving Vadfoss is part of Fylkesvei 38, which extends north across Kammerfoss River to connect onto the E18 and southwest towards Kragerø. This road is also considered part of Fylkesvei 363, which splits off from the 38 in the north to go west towards Sannidal and in the south to go east towards Helle.

Vadfoss was a train station on the now defunct Kragerø Line that transported primarily lumber and passengers.  In 1989, the whole line south of Sannidal Station was torn up in order to make way for the new main road.  Elements of the rail line still remain however, including the bridge across the river and the original station building from 1927, which is now used as a visitor center and bus depot.

Industry
Though many people live in Vadfoss, the nearby river and the dam in the north of the village have made it a popular area for industry.  Vafoss Dam was built in the late 1800s to power the Vafos AS pulp mill, the second such dam built on the river.  In 1954, the Vafoss Power Plant was put into operation on the dam by Skagerak Kraft, with the provision that one of its turbines would be used to power the pulp mill.  The hydroelectric plant uses two Francis turbines to convert a  water drop into  of power annually.  As promised, one turbine directly powers the pulp mill, and Vafos AS is still in operation, producing about 80,000 metric tonnes of pulp yearly from locally sourced spruce logs.

Vafoss Power Plant is just one of seven hydroelectric plants in the Kragerø watershed, and one of five on the Kragerø River. Other nearby plants are the Langfoss Power Plant, which lies less than half a mile up the river, and Kammerfoss Power Plant to the south of Vadfoss.

Gallery

References

External links
 Kragerø Watershed on Norwegian Wikipedia 
 

Villages in Vestfold og Telemark